Donald Jackson (25 October 1932 – 26 January 2009) was a Canadian archer. He competed in the men's individual event at the 1972 Summer Olympics.

References

1932 births
2009 deaths
Canadian male archers
Olympic archers of Canada
Archers at the 1972 Summer Olympics
Sportspeople from Kawartha Lakes
20th-century Canadian people